The Stranger from Ponca City is a 1947 American Western film directed by Derwin Abrahams and written by Ed Earl Repp. The film stars Charles Starrett, Virginia Hunter, Texas Jim Lewis and Smiley Burnette. The film was released on July 3, 1947, by Columbia Pictures.

Plot

Cast          
Charles Starrett as Steve Larkin / The Durango Kid
Virginia Hunter as Terry Saunders
Texas Jim Lewis as Texas Jim Lewis
Smiley Burnette as Smiley Burnette 
Paul Campbell as Tug Carter
Forrest Taylor as Grat Carmody
Jim Diehl as Flip Dugan
Ted Mapes as Fargo
Jock Mahoney as Tensleep
Tom McDonough as Bill
Johnny Carpenter as Duke
Bud Osborne as Jed

References

External links
 

1947 films
American Western (genre) films
1947 Western (genre) films
Columbia Pictures films
Films directed by Derwin Abrahams
American black-and-white films
1940s English-language films
1940s American films